Crater Lake (Klamath: Giiwas) is a volcanic crater lake in south-central Oregon in the western United States. It is the main feature of Crater Lake National Park and is famous for its deep blue color and water clarity. The lake partly fills a  caldera that was formed around 7,700 (± 150) years ago
by the collapse of the volcano Mount Mazama. There are no rivers flowing into or out of the lake; the evaporation is compensated for by rain and snowfall at a rate such that the total amount of water is replaced every 250 years. In the world, it ranks ninth for maximum depth, and third for mean (average) depth.

Crater Lake features two small islands. Wizard Island, located near the western shore of the lake, is a cinder cone approximately 316 acres (128 ha) in size. Phantom Ship, a natural rock pillar, is located near the southern shore.

Since 2002, one of Oregon's regular-issue license plate designs has featured Crater Lake and a one-time plate surcharge is used to support the operation of Crater Lake National Park. The commemorative Oregon State Quarter, which was released by the United States Mint in 2005, features an image of Crater Lake on its reverse.

The lake and surrounding park areas offer many recreational activities including hiking, biking, snowshoeing, fishing, and cross-country skiing are available, and during the summer, campgrounds and lodges at Crater Lake are open to visitors.

Location 

A Native American connection with this area has been traced back to before the eruption of Mount Mazama. Archaeologists have found sandals and other artifacts buried under layers of ash, dust, and pumice that predate the eruption approximately 7,700 years ago. Crater Lake remains significant to the Klamath Tribes today. The Klamath name for the lake is "Giiwas."

In June 1853, Isaac Skeeter, while on a mining trip, with John Wesley Hillman and another man were the first non-Native American colonizers to report sighting the lake and he named it "Deep Blue Lake", inspired by Hillman's description of the lake.  The lake was renamed at least three times, as Blue Lake, Lake Majesty, and finally Crater Lake.

Dimensions and depth 
On the basis of maximum depth, Crater Lake is the deepest lake in the United States, the second-deepest in North America (after Great Slave Lake in Canada), and the ninth-deepest lake in the world.

When considering the mean, or average depth of lakes, Crater Lake becomes the deepest lake in the Western Hemisphere and the third-deepest in the world. Crater Lake Institute Director and limnologist Owen Hoffman states that "Crater Lake is the deepest, when compared on the basis of average depth among lakes whose basins are entirely above sea level. The average depths of Lakes Baikal and Tanganyika are deeper than Crater Lake; however, both have basins that extend below sea level."

Geology 

Mount Mazama, part of the Cascade Range volcanic arc, was built up mostly of andesite, dacite, and rhyodacite over a period of at least 400,000 years. The caldera was created in a massive volcanic eruption between 6,000 and 8,000 years ago that led to the subsidence of Mount Mazama. About  of rhyodacite was erupted in this event. Since that time, all eruptions on Mazama have been confined to the caldera.

Lava eruptions later created a central platform, Wizard Island, Merriam Cone, and other, smaller volcanic features, including a rhyodacite dome that was eventually created atop the central platform. Sediments and landslide debris also covered the caldera floor.

Eventually, the caldera cooled, allowing rain and snow to accumulate and form a lake. Landslides from the caldera rim thereafter formed debris fans and turbidite sediments on the lake bed. Fumaroles and hot springs remained common and active during this period. Also after some time, the slopes of the lake's caldera rim more or less stabilized, streams restored a radial drainage pattern on the mountain, and dense forests began to revegetate the barren landscape. Much of this occurred during a period when the prevailing climate was less moist than at present.

Some hydrothermal activity remains along the lake floor, suggesting that at some time in the future, Mazama may erupt once again.

Climate 

Crater Lake features a subalpine climate, with the rare dry-summer type (Köppen classification Dsc) owing to its high elevation and – like all of Oregon – the strong summer influence of the North Pacific High. This snow does not usually melt until mid-July, and allows for substantial glaciers on adjacent mountains. Hard frost is possible even into the summer, and the average window for freezing temperatures is August 20 through July 10, while for measurable (≥) snowfall, September 28 through June 11.

Ecology

Since the collapse of Mount Mazama due to a volcanic eruption formed Crater Lake, no fish inhabited the lake until William G. Steel decided to stock it in 1888 to allow for fishing. Regular stocking continued until 1941, when it was evident that the fish could maintain a stable population without outside interference. Six species of fish were originally stocked, but only two species have survived: kokanee salmon and rainbow trout, with the former being the most plentiful. Fishing in Crater Lake is promoted because the fish species are not indigenous to the lake.

Crater Lake is also known for the "Old Man of the Lake", a full-sized tree which is now a log that has been bobbing vertically in the lake for over a century. The low temperature of the water has slowed the decomposition of the wood, hence its longevity.

Due to several unique factors, mainly that the lake has no inlets or tributaries, the waters of Crater Lake are some of the purest in the world because of the absence of pollutants. Clarity readings from a Secchi disk have consistently been measured as being , which is very clear for any natural body of water.

The lake has relatively high levels of dissolved salts, total alkalinity, and conductivity. The average pH has generally ranged between 7 and 8.

Sacred significance 

The Klamath tribe of Native Americans, whose oral history describes their ancestors witnessing the collapse of Mount Mazama and the formation of Crater Lake, regard the lake as an "abode to the Great Spirit". Klamath oral history tells of a battle between the sky god Skell and the god of the underworld Llao (a prominent feature at Crater Lake is Llao Rock). Mount Mazama was destroyed in the battle, creating Crater Lake, called giiwas in the Klamath language. The Klamath people used Crater Lake in vision quests, which often involved climbing the caldera walls and other dangerous tasks. Those who were successful in such quests were often regarded as having more spiritual powers. The tribe still holds Crater Lake in high regard as a spiritual site.

Recreation 
Crater Lake and the remnants of Mount Mazama can be seen from Rim Drive, a  road that surrounds the caldera, which is the only part within the Crater Lake National Park where vehicles are permitted. The Cleetwood trail leads for  down the northern flank of the caldera rim, eventually reaching Cleetwood Cove where boat trips run from late June or early July throughout the summer season to Wizard Island. Wizard Island can be climbed, offering views of Crater Lake.

Swimming is permitted in Crater Lake, but the only legal and safe way to get to the shore is by following Cleetwood Cove trail and people can enter the water from there. Other activities include fishing and a 2-hour boat tour around the lake provided by a Park Ranger from Crater Lake National Park.

As the region lies within a national park area, collecting rocks within the vicinity is prohibited unless a permit is obtained.  The park's facilities lie at Rim Village, at the southern edge of the caldera. Lodging and camping facilities open during the summer season between May and October. No lodges, gas stations, or camping areas remain open from October through late May. Popular activities within Crater Lake National Park include biking, fishing, cross-country skiing, and snowshoeing.

See also 

 List of lakes in Oregon
 Volcanic Legacy Scenic Byway

Notes

References 
 
 Geology of National Parks: Fifth Edition, Ann G. Harris, Esther Tuttle, Sherwood D. Tuttle, (Iowa, Kendall/Hunt Publishing; 1997) 
 
 Oregon, Moon Handbooks, Judy Jewell, W. C. McRae, (Avalon Travel, Berkeley; 2012, 9th edition)

External links 

 NPS: Crater Lake National Park
 Crater Lake Data Clearinghouse 
 Oregon Institute of Technology: Crater Lake Digital Research Collection

 
Crater Lake National Park
Lakes of Oregon
Volcanic crater lakes
Sacred lakes
Religious places of the indigenous peoples of North America
Cascade Volcanoes
Subduction volcanoes
Calderas of Oregon
VEI-7 volcanoes
Cascade Range
Lakes of Klamath County, Oregon
Volcanism of Oregon